Dairy cattle are those primarily raised for their milk as part of dairy farming.

Notes

References

http://www.thecattlesite.com/breeds/dairy/
http://www.raw-milk-facts.com/dairy_cow_breeds.html
http://www.sites.ext.vt.edu/virtualfarm/dairy/dairy_breeds.html
http://www.wellfedhomestead.com/choosing-a-dairy-cow-breeds
http://www.dairy.edu.au/discoverdairy/Students/From-Farm-to-Plate/About-Dairy-Cows.aspx
http://www.thedairysite.com/breeds/dairy/

Bibliography 
 Hasheider, Philip (2011). The Family Cow Handbook: A Guide to Keeping a Milk Cow. Voyageur Press Inc. 

Cattle
Dairy farming
Lists of breeds
Dairy cattle breeds